Fiji competed at the 1988 Summer Olympics in Seoul, South Korea.  The Fiji Association of Sports and National Olympic Committee was formed in 1949 and recognized by the IOC in 1955.

Competitors
The following is the list of number of competitors in the Games.

Athletics

Men

Track events

Women

Track events

Boxing

Judo 

Men

Sailing

Men

Swimming

Men

Women

References

Official Olympic Reports

Nations at the 1988 Summer Olympics
1988
1988 in Fijian sport